The Atlantic and Danville Railway  was a Class I railroad which operated in Virginia and North Carolina. The company was founded in 1882 and opened its mainline between Portsmouth, Virginia and Danville, Virginia in 1890. The Southern Railway leased the company from 1899–1949. The Norfolk and Western Railway purchased the company in 1962 and reorganized it as the Norfolk, Franklin and Danville Railway.

History 

The Atlantic and Danville Railway was incorporated in 1882 and opened its mainline between Portsmouth and Danville in 1890. The Southern Railway leased the company from 1899–1949. A  branch line ran from Emporia, Virginia to Claremont, Virginia and interchanged with the Atlantic Coast Line Railroad. The Southern Railway discontinued service on this branch in 1932; the Gray Lumber Company continued to use it for logging operations until 1938.

After the Southern terminated the lease the Atlantic and Danville continued as an independent company for another dozen years. The company went bankrupt in 1960 and was purchased by the Norfolk and Western Railway in 1962. The N&W created a new subsidiary, the Norfolk, Franklin and Danville Railway, to operate the A&D line.

The former A&D line from West Norfolk to Suffolk is currently in operation as the Commonwealth Railway. The Tobacco Heritage Trail is built on the old Atlantic and Danville Railway right of way in Brodnax, Virginia and La Crosse to South Hill, Virginia.

Stations

The Atlantic and Danville Railway had a 205 mile main line, Norfolk and Danville, in 1951. West Norfolk and Boon was a six mile spur. The train main line had trains that left Norfolk at 10:01 PM and arrived in Danville at 5:45 AM the next day. Then left at Danville at 8:45 PM and arrived in Norfolk at 5:40 AM the next day.

Norfolk and Danville
 Norfolk 
 Portsmouth
 Pinners Point, which now has Pinners Point Interchange.
 Boone, a populated place in Chesapeake, Virginia
 Suffolk 
 Holland 
 Franklin 
 Courtland
 Drewryville
 Emporia
 Pleasant Shade, between where Virginia State Route 607 crosses the A&D and U.S. Route 58.
 Lawrenceville
 Brodnax
 La Crosse
 South Hill
 Union Level 
 Baskerville 
 Boydton 
 Jeffress, where Virginia State Route 702 crosses the A&D.
 Antlers, where Virginia State Route 678 crosses the A&D.
 South Clarksville 
 Buffalo Junction 
 Virgilina
 Denniston, where Virginia State Route 711 crosses the A&D.
 Milton, stop for Milton, North Carolina
 Danville
West Norfolk and Boone
 West Norfolk
 Churchland
 Boone

Railroad Company in 1896
The railroad company was organized as the Richmond and Mecklenburg which was operated by the Southern Railway in 1896. All but one of the board of Directors and the two officers lived in New York City, New York.  The railroad employed 315 people in 1896, including the company officers, clerks, firemen, engine men, conductors, ticket agents, carpenters, foremen, laborers and telegraph operators and dispatchers.  The trains carried passengers and mail and freight. Outbound freight consisted coal, lumber, and farm products such as flour, wheat, hay, tobacco and fruits and vegetables as well as livestock, meats, wool and leather. Inbound freight included petroleum, oil, naval stores, cast iron products, machinery, cement, brick, lime, agricultural tools, wagons, alcoholic beverages, furniture and housewares. Cars were equipped with Janney couplers and Westinghouse Air Brake Company brakes.

There was one injury to an employee in 1896.  Western Union operated the telegraph on the track.

Notes

References 
 
 

3 ft gauge railways in the United States
Defunct Virginia railroads
Defunct North Carolina railroads
Predecessors of the Norfolk and Western Railway
Railway companies established in 1882
Railway companies disestablished in 1962
Former Class I railroads in the United States
1882 establishments in Virginia
American companies disestablished in 1962
American companies established in 1882